No Return is a 1973 Soviet drama film directed by Aleksei Saltykov.

Plot 
The love story of Antonina and the battalion commander Nikitin, whom she sheltered after being seriously wounded. They want to expel Antonina Kashirina from the party, accusing that during the war the Don Cossack woman lived in the territory occupied by the Germans. They do not believe her that she hid and left the wounded Soviet officer.

Unable to withstand offensive suspicions, she leaves the party committee bureau. On the way home, Tonya recalls how she picked up a bleeding artilleryman  battalion commander Nikitin, covered him and treated him, how she fell in love.

Cast 
 Nonna Mordyukova as Antonina Kashirina
 Vladislav Dvorzhetsky as Nikolay Yakovlevich Nikitin
 Olga Prokhorova as Irina Alekseyevna
 Nikolai Yeremenko Jr. as Grigory, Antonina's son
 Tatyana Samoylova as Nastyura Shevtsova
 Boris Kudryavtsev as Pavel Ivanovich Neverov
 Aleksey Batalov as Aleksey Vladimirovich Yegorov
 Nina Menshikova as Antonina Ivanovna Korotkova
 Vilnis Bekeris as German corporal
 Alexey Borzunov as Konstantin Sukharev

References

External links 
 

1973 films
1970s Russian-language films
1973 romantic drama films
Mosfilm films
Soviet romantic drama films